Sin Chung-kai (born 15 June 1960) is a former member of the Hong Kong Legislative Council. He was the chairman and a member of Kwai Tsing District Council for the Wah Lai constituency. He was one of the two vice-chairmen of the Democratic Party until December 2012, and now serves as a member of the Executive Committee.

Early career 
In 1982, Sin obtained his bachelor's degree at the University of Hong Kong, where he served as the Current Affairs Secretary of the Student Union. In 1997, he obtained a Master in Business Administration at the Chinese University of Hong Kong.

Sin was formerly employed as an Information Technology manager at HSBC, resigning in 2011 to focus on his political career.

Political career

District Council 
Sin's political career began in 1985 when he was first elected to the Kwai Tsing District Board. He was re-elected in subsequent elections, remaining in this role until 2003. Between the years 1994–1999, Sin served as the chairperson of the board.

In 2011, Sin was one of the contenders in the district council election, representing the Tai Hang constituency. He got 40.9% of the votes, losing to Wong Chor-fung of the New People's Party (NPP). In 2014, Sin participated in the by-election for the South Horizons West constituency, where he got 22.9% of the votes and lost to Judy Chan from the NPP.

In 2019, Sin contested in the district council election for the Wah Lai constituency. He won the seat with 51.93% of the votes, defeating pro-Beijing incumbent Wong Yiu-chung. He also became chairperson of the Kwai Tsing District Board again, starting in January 2020.

Legislative Council 
In 1995, Sin ran the Hong Kong legislative election for the New Territories South constituency, winning dominantly with 70.74% of the votes over two other candidates. In 1998, Sin participated in the legislative election, representing the Information Technology functional constituency. He was elected to the Legislative Council with 63.71% of the votes. Sin was re-elected in 2000 and 2004 within the same constituency.

Sin contested in the 2012 Hong Kong legislative election, where he represented the Hong Kong Island constituency. He came in second place after Kenneth Chan Ka-lok with 12.26% of the votes, which secured him a seat on the Legislative Council.

Political activities 
Sin served as an executive committee member in the United Democrats of Hong Kong (UDHK) between the years 1990–1994. Since 1994, he has been affiliated with the Democratic Party. He was also the former vice chairperson of the party. In December 2012, Sin contested in the leadership election of the party, following the resignation of Albert Ho in the aftermath of the 2012 Legislative Council election. Sin lost narrowly to Emily Lau, who had 149 votes to his 133 votes.

In 2007, Sin was awarded the Silver Bauhinia Star for his contributions to public affairs. During his political career, Sin had advocated for human rights, economic prosperity, and free flow of information in Hong Kong. He introduced numerous initiatives to develop the city's IT and telecommunications industries.

On 18 April 2020, Sin was among the 15 prominent pro-democracy figures arrested in Hong Kong. His arrest was made based on the claim that he took part in an unauthorized assembly on 1 October 2019 during the anti-extradition bill protests.

On 10 June 2022, Sin, along the two other pro-democracy figures, had his Silver Bauhinia Star honour removed, and his Justice of the Peace appointment was revoked by the government due to his jail sentences related to anti extradition-bill protests.

Personal life 
Sin has been married to his wife since 1986. They have two sons.

References

External links
Cyber Office of Sin Chung-kai, Legislative Councillor (ITFC)

1960 births
Living people
Alumni of the University of Hong Kong
Alumni of the Chinese University of Hong Kong
District councillors of Kwai Tsing District
Democratic Party (Hong Kong) politicians
HSBC people
United Democrats of Hong Kong politicians
Hong Kong Association for Democracy and People's Livelihood politicians
HK LegCo Members 1995–1997
HK LegCo Members 1998–2000
HK LegCo Members 2000–2004
HK LegCo Members 2004–2008
HK LegCo Members 2012–2016
Members of the Election Committee of Hong Kong, 2012–2017
Members of the Election Committee of Hong Kong, 2017–2021
Recipients of the Silver Bauhinia Star